Sikandra Assembly constituency is an assembly constituency for Bihar Legislative Assembly in Jamui district of Bihar, India. It comes under Jamui (Lok Sabha constituency).

Members of Legislative Assembly

Election Results

2020

References

External links
 

Assembly constituencies of Bihar